The All Along Stakes is an American Thoroughbred horse race run annually in September at Laurel Park Racecourse in Laurel, Maryland. Open to fillies and mares, age three and older, it is raced on turf at a distance of  miles. The race currently offers a purse of $150,000. In 2015, the Maryland Jockey Club agreed to move the Stakes race and run it at Laurel Park changing the name of a former race Lady Baltimore Stakes to the All Along Stakes.

The race is named for the great French racing mare, All Along. Owned by Daniel Wildenstein, she raced in Europe and North America. All Along was the 1983 Champion Older Mare in France and 1983 American Horse of the Year who was inducted in the United States Racing Hall of Fame in 1990.

The All Along Stakes has been held at four different tracks all in the Mid-atlantic region of the United States, it was held at Colonial Downs in New Kent County, Virginia from 1998–2013 and Laurel Park Racecourse from 1985–1996. The race was also held at Delaware Park in 1997 and Pimlico Race Course in 1990. The race was not held in 1986 or 1987. It was first graded in 1988 and it became a grade two race in 1990 and continued that way until 1997. Since 1998 the race has maintained its grade three status. The race was run at a distance of  miles from 1998–2014 and  miles in 1999 and 2000.

The All Along Stakes has served as a prep race to Breeders' Cup Filly & Mare Turf a Grade 1 race held as part of the World Thoroughbred Championships. In 2010 race served as the perfect race to Shared Account who went on to win the 2010 Breeders' Cup Filly & Mare Turf a Grade 1 race held at Churchill Downs. In December 2010 Shared Account went on to be named Maryland Horse-of-the-Year.

Records 

Most wins by a horse: 
 2 – Film Maker (2004 & 2006)

Speed record: 
  mile : 1:39.87 – Onus  (2016)
  mile : 1:46.58 – Film Maker  (2006)
  mile : 1:55.95 – Idle Rich  (2000)

Most wins by an owner:
 2 – Stuart S. Janney III  (2016 & 2017)
 2 – Courtlandt Farms  (2004 & 2006)

Most wins by a jockey:
 4 – Edgar Prado   (1998, 2003 2004 & 2010)

Most wins by a trainer:
 7 – H. Graham Motion   (1998, 2004 2006, 2008, 2010, 2011 & 2015)

Winners of the "All Along Stakes" since 1985

References
 The 2008 All Along Stakes at the NTRA

Graded stakes races in the United States
Recurring sporting events established in 1981
Turf races in the United States
Mile category horse races for fillies and mares
Horse races in Maryland
1981 establishments in Virginia